The 2005 Mississippi State Bulldogs football team represented Mississippi State University during the 2005 NCAA Division I FBS football season. The team's head coach was Sylvester Croom. The Bulldogs played their home games in 2005 at Davis Wade Stadium in Starkville, Mississippi

Schedule

References

Mississippi State
Mississippi State Bulldogs football seasons
Mississippi State Bulldogs football